Harmon J. Fisk (August 1, 1839 – April 5, 1912) was a member of the Wisconsin State Assembly.

Life
Fisk was born in Stafford, New York. He later resided in Columbus, Wisconsin. He married Lucy Daniels (1841–1920). Fisk died at his home in Fall River, Wisconsin in 1912.

Assembly career
Fisk was a member of the Assembly during the 1877 session. He was a Republican.

References

External links

People from Stafford, New York
People from Columbus, Wisconsin
Republican Party members of the Wisconsin State Assembly
1839 births
1912 deaths